Gaines may refer to:

Places
United States
 Gaines, Michigan, a village
 Gaines Township, Genesee County, Michigan, a civil township in which the above village is located
 Gaines Township, Kent County, Michigan, a charter township
 Gaines, New York, a town
 Gaines, West Virginia, an unincorporated community

People
 Gaines (surname)
 Gaines A. Knapp (1848–1918), American politician